The 1968 United States presidential election in North Dakota took place on November 5, 1968, as part of the 1968 United States presidential election. Voters chose four representatives, or electors, to the Electoral College, who voted for President and Vice President.

North Dakota was won by former Vice President Richard Nixon (Republican Party, California), with 55.94% of the popular vote, against Vice President Hubert Humphrey (Democratic Party, Minnesota), with 38.23% of the popular vote, a 17.71% margin of victory. Independent candidate George Wallace received 5.75% of the popular vote. North Dakota was Nixon's fourth strongest state after Nebraska, Idaho and Utah.

This is the last election in which North Dakota had four electoral college votes; it lost its 2nd district due to reapportionment based on the 1970 Census.

Results

Results by county

See also
 United States presidential elections in North Dakota

Notes

References

North Dakota
1968
1968 North Dakota elections